Di Francesco (or di Francesco) is an Italian surname. Notable people with this surname include:

 Eusebio Di Francesco (born 1969), Italian football player and manager
 Federico Di Francesco (born 1994), Italian footballer
 Gianmarco Di Francesco (born 1989), Italian cyclist
 Giovanni di Francesco (1412–1459), Italian painter
 Lupo di Francesco ( 14th century), Italian sculptor and architect
 Mauro Di Francesco (born 1951), Italian actor, comedian and television personality
 Philippe Di Francesco, French-American mathematician
 Stefano di Francesco (died 1427), Italian painter

See also 
 Francesco
 De Francesco

Italian-language surnames
Patronymic surnames
Surnames from given names